Sandor is a census town falling within the Vasai (Bassein) municipality of the Palghar district (previously Taana district), in the Konkan division  of Maharashtra, India. Sandoris, the natives of Sandor, are predominantly Roman Catholic Kshatriyas of the Christian Bombay East Indian community, they converted in the colony centred around Bassein, the richest possession of the former Portuguese East Indies with the capital at Velha Goa, in the southern edge of the Konkan region. Prior to the arrival of Portuguese Armadas, there had also been some Nestorians  descended from Jewish converts, by the efforts of the apostles Thomas or Bartholomew.

History

The natives of the Bassein (Vasai) are predominantly people whose culture derives from a composite of the Konkani substrate, overlaid by the Portuguese, Marathi& British rulers. The Sandoris are predominantly of the Vadval sub-ethnic group, and speak the Vadvali dialect, which is considered by the government as a dialect of Marathi, although this view is disputed.

Following the conversions of 1564, a Portuguese noblewoman, Donna Irina, had a chapel, Our Lady of Help (Nossa Senhora da Ajuda) built in the village for the converts. The first Holy Mass was held in this chapel on 11 November 1566 by the Jesuit missionaries. A Sandorian tradition states that St Gonsalo Garcia, who was martyred in Shogunate era Japan, was present as a young boy at the foundation laying ceremony of the chapel.

The chapel was renamed after Thomas the Apostle, when in 1565, his picture was brought from the fort and enshrined in the chapel. It seems that sometime or the other a new church was built a little further towards the north occupying the actual site on which the present edifice stands. The church was destroyed by invaders from Sultanate of Guzerat in 1571, and was reconstructed in 1573.

Pedro de Almeida, a Jesuit was appointed the 'Pai dos Cristaos' for 1574–1576, with charge of the Christians of Sandor and Papdy parishes.

In 1679, Arabs from Gujarat once again attacked and damaged the church.  In 1690, a certain invader by name of 'Kakaji' also attacked and damaged the church.

The Mahratta Invasion of Bassein in 1739 did not destroy the chapel, although the Jesuits were forced to leave and it was thereafter served by the secular priests.

The chapel was enlarged in 1889. The three altars of the chapel are from one of the original churches in the Fort San Sebastian of Bassein.  At some time, a cross and a grotto to Our Lady of Lourdes was added.

It is not known when the chapel was elevated to the rank of a parish church, but from the evidence, it seems to be some time before 1574.

Subsequently, the parishes of Our Lady of Remedies at Remedy, Our Lady of Grace at Papdy, Mae de Deus (Mother of God) at Palle, Our Lady of Mercy at Merces and St. Michael the Archangel at Porim (Manickpur) were carved out of it (1574–1606).

Sandor and the rest of the Vasai area were not disturbed by the intra-Catholic Padroado vs Propaganda Fide conflict, as the area remained firmly faithful to the Archbishop of Goa and refused to accept the authority of the Vicar Apostolic of Bombay and their successor, the Archbishop of Bombay.

In 1886, the northern part of the Archdiocese of Goa was carved out as the Diocese of Damaon, including the Vasai, and it was only in 1928 that the two dioceses (Damaon and Bombay) were merged, so that the Vasai area came under the Archbishops of Bombay for the first time in 1928.

At present, the parish of Sandor also serves the village of Saloli. The church celebrates its feast 9–15 December every year, and has a big feast in the evenings.

The village of Sandor has now been made part of the Municipal Corporation of Vasai-Virar.

Parish priests of St Thomas Church from the available records are as follows:

Below is a list of assistant priests :

Demographics
 India census, Sandor had a population of 8336. Males constitute 51% of the population and females 49%. Sandor has an average literacy rate of 78%, higher than the national average of 59.5%: male literacy is 83%, and female literacy is 73%. In Sandor, 10% of the population is under 6 years of age.

Church based charity/social organizations 

Started in 1971 under the leadership of Very Rev. late Msgr. Philip Tavares the then parish priest of the Church. This society is a part of Society of St. Vincent de Paul, Paris, France, an international organization of Roman Catholic lay men and women of all ages, whose primary mission is to help the poor and less fortunate.

Founded in 1833 by Frederick Ozanam, a French lawyer, author, and professor in the Sorbonne University of Paris to help impoverished people living in the slums of Paris, France.

The Society numbers about 950,000 in some 132 countries worldwide, whose members operate through "conferences". A conference may be based out of a church, community center, school, hospital, etc., and is composed of Catholic volunteers.

Schools 
Carmelite Convent English High School, Sandor, Vasai west 401201
 St. Thomas High School, Sandor
Notre Dame School

See also 
 East Indians
 Norteiro people

References 

 Catholic Directory of the Archdiocese of Bombay, 1960, 1964 edition, by Monsignor Simon I. Pimenta on the occasion of the 38th International Eucharistic Congress in Bombay, Government Press, Nagpur
 Catholic Directory of the Archdiocese of Bombay, 1960, 1982 edition, by Fr. Leslie J. Ratus and Fr. Errol Rozario, St. Pius X College, Goregaon, Bombay, 400063

External links
 Sandor Parish map
 Map of East Indian villages

Konkan
Villages in Palghar district